The Black Hand: The Epic War Between a Brilliant Detective and the Deadliest Secret Society in American History is a non-fiction book written by Irish American author Stephan Talty, published by Houghton Mifflin Harcourt on 25 April 2017.

Characters
 Joseph Petrosino – a New York City police officer who is a pioneer in the fight against organized crime.

Reception
The book received praise from critics. Author Mark Adams said: "The Black Hand is nonfiction noir at its best: a real-life Godfather prequel that pits an unforgettable Italian-American hero against the seemingly unstoppable menace that would become the New York mafia". Kirkus Reviews said it was: "A thrilling tale of the "Italian Sherlock Holmes"".

Film adaptation
In 2017, Paramount Pictures announced that it had acquired the movie rights to Talty's book. Leonardo DiCaprio was slated to star as Petrosino.

References

External links
 Official website

American non-fiction books
2017 non-fiction books
Houghton Mifflin books